Koliada or Koleda is a Slavic mythological deity personalizing the newborn winter infant Sun and symbolizing the New Year's cycle. The figure of Koliada is connected with the solar cycle, (the Slavic root *kol- suggests a wheel or circularity) passing through the four seasons and from one substantial condition into another.

In the different  Slavic countries at the  koliada winter festival people performed rituals with games and songs in honour of the deity - like  koleduvane. In some regions of Russia the ritual gifts (usually buns) for the koledari are also called . In the lands of the Croats a doll, called Koled, symbolized Koliada. In the ancient times Slavs used to sacrifice horses, goats, cows, bears or other animals that personify  fertility. Koliada is mentioned either as a male or (more commonly) as a female deity in the songs.

In modern culture 

There are many traditions that recall both the deity and the ritual of Koliada. All of them are on or around Winter Solstice:

Koleduvane is a ceremony with pagan roots that is still performed on Christmas Eve in many Slavic countries.
Koleda is the modern Bulgarian word for Christmas. 
Koliadka, Koliada or Kaleda is a traditional song usually sung in Eastern Slavic countries (Belarus and Ukraine) only on Orthodox Christmas holidays, between the 7 and 14 of January
Crăciun is the Romanian and Karácsony - the Hungarian word for Christmas. They are both derived from Korochun/Krachun - one of the names of the pagan holiday Koliada, although neither Romania nor Hungary are Slavic countries.
Kalėdos is the Lithuanian word for Christmas.

There are Slavic neopagan communities in most of the Slavic countries whose goal is to popularize ancient pagan belief and practice in present-day society.

Some Slavic  pagan rock and folk rock bands have songs about Koliada:

Song of the Russian folk band Ivan Kupala, called Kolyada 
Song of the Russian pagan metal band Arkona, called Kolyada 
Song of the Belarusian pagan metal band Kolo Pravi - Goy Kolyada 
Song Kolyada of the Russian band Veter vody
Song Kolyada of the Ukrainian female singer Iryna Fedyshyn
Song Kolyada my of the Ukrainian female singer Iryna Fedyshyn
Song Kolyada-kolyadka of the Ukrainian female singer Iryna Dolya

See also 
 Slavic deities
 Slavic mythology
 Koledari

References

External links 
 Koliada // Russian mythological calendar
  Kozlov, M.М. God–baby Koljada in pagan consciousness of east Slavs

Slavic pseudo-deities
Slavic gods
Slavic Christmas traditions
Slavic culture
Slavic holidays